The Festa de Nossa Senhora do Rosário  translates to Festival of Our Lady of Rosário. It is the main celebration in the Brazilian city of Córrego Danta. Festa do Rosário, a  celebration which involves almost all of the Catholic people in Córrego Danta, starts with a mass in the main church and then a procession from the church to the Church of Our Lady of Rosary. Here is another celebration when the flag with an image of the saint is raised. It takes place in the city during the third weekend of August.

References

Patronal festivals in Brazil
August events